Spirotheca is a genus of trees in the family Malvaceae, native to Central and South America.

Species 
Currently recognized species in Spirotheca are:
 Spirotheca awadendron
 Spirotheca elegans
 Spirotheca mahechae
 Spirotheca michaeli
 Spirotheca rivieri
 Spirotheca rosea

References 

Malvaceae genera
Bombacoideae